Events from the year 1674 in China.

Incumbents 
 Kangxi Emperor (13th year)

Events 
 The Revolt of the Three Feudatories continues
 January — Wu Sangui captures Guizhou
 Geng Jingzhong declares a rebellion in Fujian, forces Fujian Governor General Fan Chengmo to commit suicide
 Zheng Jing, ruler of the Kingdom of Tungning, leads a 150,000 strong army from Taiwan and lands in Fujian to join the rebel forces
 Sino-Russian border conflicts

Births
 Yunreng (6 June 1674 – 27 January 1725), born Yinreng, a Manchu prince of the Qing dynasty. He was the second among the Kangxi Emperor's sons to survive into adulthood and was designated as Crown Prince for two terms between 1675 and 1712 before being deposed

Deaths
 Fan Chengmo, Governor of Fujian
 Wu Yingxiong and his sons with Princess Jianning, executed due to his father Wu Sangui's rebellion

References

 
 .

 
China